This article lists the winners and nominees for the Black Reel Award for Outstanding Voice Performance. This category was first presented in 2010, but was retired until the 2013 ceremony.

Winners and nominees
Winners are listed first and highlighted in bold.

2010s

2020s

Multiple nominations and wins

Multiple nominations
8 Nominations
 Maya Rudolph

3 Nominations

 Keith David
 Idris Elba

2 Nominations

 Vin Diesel
 Samuel L. Jackson
 Zoe Saldana

Multiple nominations from the same film
 Anika Noni Rose (winner) & Keith David in The Princess and the Frog (2010)
 Queen Latifah and Wanda Sykes in Ice Age: Continental Drift (2013)
 Samuel L. Jackson (winner), Snoop Dogg and Maya Rudolph in  Turbo (2014)
 Maya Rudolph and Damon Wayans Jr. in  Big Hero 6 (2015)
 Idris Elba (winner) & Lupita Nyong'o in  The Jungle Book (2017)
 Shameik Moore (winner), Mahershala Ali & Brian Tyree Henry in Spider-Man: Into the Spider-Verse (2019)
 Chiwetel Ejiofor (winner), James Earl Jones & Donald Glover in  The Lion King (2020)
 Jordan Peele & Keegan-Michael Key in Toy Story 4 (2020)
 Jamie Foxx (winner), Angela Bassett & Phylicia Rashad in  Soul (2021)
 Maya Rudolph (winner) & Eric André in The Mitchells vs. the Machines (2022)

References

Black Reel Awards